Henicheska Hirka is a village located in the Arabat Spit, in the Henichesk raion of the Kherson oblast, Ukraine. It belongs to Henichesk urban hromada, one of the hromadas of Ukraine. Henicheska Hirka has a population of 495 inhabitants.

References

Villages in Henichesk Raion
Spa towns in Ukraine